The Last Port is a  monophonic black-and-white film written and directed by filmmaker Arnold Kordyum (1890–1969) after Alexander Korneychuk's 1933 play The Death of the Squadron (Gibel eskadry). Produced by Ukrainfilm in 1934 to be released on 19 January 1935, it starred Pyotr Masokha (1904–1991), Sergei Minin (1901–1937) and Ladislav Golichenko, with film score by Viktor Kosenko.

Plot summary 
On the struggle of the communist sailors with the White Guards and the German occupiers in the Crimea during the civil war.

Cast 

 Sergei Minin as Commissioner of the Black Sea Fleet
 Pavel Kiyansky as Naval officer
 Pyotr Masokha as Envoy of the Baltic Fleet
 N. Bukaev as Sailor with a bandage
 Arnold Kordyum as Sailor with accordion
 Luka Lyashenko as Sailor from Priluk
 I. Marx as Old worker
 Lydia Ostrovskaya-Kurdyum as Working woman
 Dmitri Erdman as Lieutenant
 Pavel Petrik as German officer (as P. Petrik)
 A. Doroshkevich as Petliurist
 Mikhail Gornatko as Interventionist commissioner
 Stepan Shagaida as Admiral
 L. Golichenko as Sterna — boatswain
 Mikhail Gayvoronsky as Aleksandr Zapolsky
 Boris Karlash-Verbitsky as Sailor
 A. Kerner

References

External links

1935 films
1935 drama films
Films set in Ukraine
Soviet silent films
Soviet-era Ukrainian films
Soviet black-and-white films
Ukrainian black-and-white films
Compositions by Viktor Kosenko
Soviet drama films
Ukrainian drama films
Silent drama films